Yvo van Engelen (born 24 January 1985) is a Dutch footballer who plays for amateur side Vlijmense Boys.

Club career
Van Engelen is a defender who was born in Vlijmen and made his debut in professional football for NAC Breda in a September 2005 Eredivisie match against AZ.

After two seasons at TOP Oss, van Engelen moved into amateur football and played nine years for OJC Rosmalen before joining DESK in summer 2016. Two years later, he returned to childhood club Vlijmense Boys.

Personal life
He is the son of former PSV Eindhoven goalkeeper Ton van Engelen.

Statistics 

Last update: October 28, 2008

References

1985 births
Living people
People from Heusden
Footballers from North Brabant
Association football defenders
Dutch footballers
NAC Breda players
TOP Oss players
OJC Rosmalen players
Eerste Divisie players
Eredivisie players